Soundtrack '96–'06 is the first official greatest hits compilation by the Italian singer Elisa. The album was certified Diamond in Italy, with sales exceeding 600,000 copies.

There are four new tracks on the album, the first single was "Gli Ostacoli del Cuore" featuring the Italian singer Luciano Ligabue, the song debuted at number-one of the Italian Digital Chart and the Italian Airplay Chart. The second single from the album was the ballad "Eppure Sentire (Un Senso Di Te)", the soundtrack of the movie Manuale d'amore 2 by Giovanni Veronesi. The third single was "Stay" released on 6 April 2007.
The last single from the album was "Qualcosa Che Non C'è".
In July 2007 was released Caterpillar, the international version of Soundtrack '96-'06.

Soundtrack '96-'06 was the best selling album in Italy in 2007. It was also the most downloaded album from iTunes Italy in 2007.

Track listing

DVD
"Sleeping in Your Hand"
"Labyrinth"
"A Feast for Me"
"Cure Me"
"Gift"
"Asile’s World"
"Luce (Tramonti a Nord Est)"
"Heaven Out of Hell"
"Rainbow"
"Dancing"
"Almeno tu nell’universo"
"Broken"
"Electricity"
"Together"
"The Waves"
"Una poesia anche per te"
"Swan"
"Teach Me Again"

Chart performance

References

Elisa (Italian singer) compilation albums
2006 compilation albums
2006 video albums
Music video compilation albums